The Saint Lucian records in swimming are the fastest ever performances of swimmers from Saint Lucia, which are recognised and ratified by the Saint Lucia Aquatics Association (SLAF).

All records were set in finals unless noted otherwise.

Long Course (50 m)

Men

Women

Mixed relay

Short Course (25 m)

Men

Women

References

External links
 SLAF web site

Saint Lucia
Records
Swimming